Yiinthi is a genus of South Pacific huntsman spiders that was first described by V. T. Davies in 1994. Y. lycodes was transferred from Heteropoda.

Species
 it contains eight species, found in Papua New Guinea and Australia:
Yiinthi anzsesorum Davies, 1994 – Australia (Queensland)
Yiinthi chillagoe Davies, 1994 – Australia (Queensland)
Yiinthi gallonae Davies, 1994 – Australia (Queensland)
Yiinthi kakadu Davies, 1994 – Australia (Western Australia, Northern Territory)
Yiinthi lycodes (Thorell, 1881) – New Guinea, Australia (Queensland)
Yiinthi molloyensis Davies, 1994 – Australia (Queensland)
Yiinthi spathula Davies, 1994 (type) – Australia (Queensland)
Yiinthi torresiana Davies, 1994 – Australia (Queensland)

See also
 List of Sparassidae species

References

Araneomorphae genera
Sparassidae
Spiders of Asia
Spiders of Australia
Taxa named by Valerie Todd Davies